David Nevins may refer to:
David Nevins Sr. (1809–1881), industrialist 
David Nevins Jr. (1839–1898), his son, industrialist
David Nevins (television producer), American television producer and screenwriter